The Classical Association of Canada (CAC) is a national, nonprofit organization with the aim of advancing the study of the civilizations of the Greek and Roman worlds in their Mediterranean context, including philology, Classical archaeology, papyrology, epigraphy, and numismatics. The CAC encourages public awareness of the contribution and importance of Classics to both education and public life. Its official languages are English and French.

In 1946, the Ontario Classical Association (OCA) established Phoenix (classics journal), the first peer-reviewed scholarly journal dedicated to Classics published in Canada. However, The costs of maintaining a journal of that magnitude quickly exceeded the resources of the OCA. In response, the organization sought to expand nationally, leading to the creation of the Classical Association of Canada in 1947. Although it was founded in Ontario, the CAC's mandate was to represent scholarly activities in Classics from all parts of Canada.

Governance 
The CAC is governed by a Council that consists of the Immediate Past President, President, Vice President, Secretary, Treasurer, the Editor or Editors of each of the CAC's national journals, nine elected councilors, and one member representing the Graduate Student Caucus. In keeping with the mandate of the CAC, the council must be regionally representative by including members from the Atlantic Provinces, Quebec, Ontario, and the Western Provinces. The organization also promotes the activities of two internal networks, the Women's Network and Graduate Student Caucus.

The current President of the CAC is Dr. Allison Glazebrook, Professor at Brock University, and the current Vice President is Bruce Robertson, Professor at Mount Allison University.

Activities 

The CAC seeks to promote knowledge of and research on the ancient Greek and Roman worlds through a variety of activities. These activities include an annual meeting and conference, publications, lecture tours, undergraduate and graduate competitions, awards and scholarships, as well as additional programming organized by the Graduate Caucus and Women's Network.

Annual Meeting and Conference 

Each year the CAC hosts an annual meeting and conference at a Canadian university, the location of which is usually established up to three years in advance. Until 1998, the CAC met at the annual Congress of Learned Societies, hosted for the Canadian Federation for the Humanities and Social Sciences. In 1999, however, the first independent annual meeting was held by the CAC at Université Laval in Quebec City. The site of the meeting cycles through the various regions of Canada in order to facilitate the attendance of scholars and students from those regions and to provide opportunities to raise public awareness of the discipline nationally. The Annual Meeting takes places over three days, normally in the first half of May, and includes presentations of scholars’ research and a keynote address from an eminent scholar in the field of Classics.

Previous Conferences:
 2019 - McMaster University, Hamilton
 2018 – University of Calgary, Calgary
 2017 – Memorial University of Newfoundland, St. John's
 2016 – Université Laval, Quebec City
 2015 – University of Toronto, Toronto
 2014 – McGill University, Montreal
 2013 – University of Manitoba and University of Winnipeg, Winnipeg
 2012 – University of Western Ontario, London
 2011 – Dalhousie University, Halifax
 2010 – Université Laval, Quebec City
 2009 – University of British Columbia, Vancouver
 2008 – Université de Montréal, Montreal

Upcoming Conferences:
 2020 - University of Victoria, Victoria
 2021 - Université Laval, Quebec City
 2022 - Saint Mary's University (Halifax), Halifax

Publications 

The CAC publishes two journals, Phoenix and Mouseion (formerly Echoes du Monde Classique / Classical Views), and one electronic newsletter, Canadian Classical Bulletin (generally known as the CCB). The CCB is fully electronically archived and can be found in the Electronic Collection of Library and Archives Canada.

Lecture Tours 

The CAC sponsors three annual public lecture tours: Western, Central, Atlantic (co-sponsored by the Atlantic Classical Association). These tours bring Canadian scholars from one region of the country to speak at several universities in another region.

Competitions 
The CAC sponsors several competitions for students at all levels of study.
 National Greek and Latin sight translation competitions: each January, the CAC holds sight translation competitions in both Latin and Greek for high school students (Latin only) and undergraduate students at Canadian universities. The Junior Greek and Latin competitions are open to students with less than two years of language study, while the Senior Competitions are open to students with two or more years of study.
 Undergraduate Essay Contest: this contest aims to promote and showcase the excellent research done by undergraduate students in Classics courses at Canadian universities.
 Graduate Student Presentation Prize: this prize is awarded each year at the Annual Meeting to the graduate student, Masters or doctoral, who presents the best paper at the meeting.
 Doctoral Thesis Prize: this prize is awarded every two years to the best doctoral thesis completed in Classics at a Canadian University.

Awards and scholarships 

The CAC provides several scholarships and awards to support students and teachers of Classics. The Desmond Conacher Scholarship is awarded each year to a Canadian student who is beginning graduate studies. The scholarship was named in memory of Desmond Conacher, Professor of Classics at Trinity College, Toronto, and an Honorary President of the CAC. The Grace Irwin Award is awarded to teachers of Classics in the high school system who are seeking to expand their knowledge of Classics through travel or training courses. The award was named in memory of Grace Irwin, a well-loved teacher of Classics at Humberside Collegiate Institute in Toronto. At the 2019 Annual General Meeting, the CAC announced two new awards, both to be distributed for the first time beginning in 2020. The Elaine Fantham Award in Public Engagement and the Mosaic Scholarship, which has allocated $500 for students from underrepresented groups.

Notable Members 

Many notable scholars have been members of the CAC, including Edward Togo Salmon, George Grube, Leonard E. Woodbury, Edmund G. Berry, James Allan Stewart Evans, Alison Keith, and Elaine Fantham.

References

External links 
 Official web site
 Phoenix
 Mouseion
 Women's Network

Classical associations and societies
Organizations established in 1947
1947 establishments in Canada